The Brawling Act 1553 (1 Mary Sess 2 c 3) was an Act of the Parliament of England.

Section 6 of the Ecclesiastical Courts Jurisdiction Act 1860 provided that nothing contained in that Act was to be taken to repeal or alter the Brawling Act 1553.

The whole Act was repealed by section 13(2) of, and Part I of Schedule 4 to, the Criminal Law Act 1967.

See also
Brawling (legal definition)

References
Halsbury's Statutes,

Acts of the Parliament of England (1485–1603)
1553 in law
1553 in England